Afton is a city in Washington County, Minnesota, United States. The population was 2,886 at the 2010 United States Census. It lies on a small bay where Valley Creek empties into the St. Croix River, several miles north of its confluence with the Mississippi River.

Afton is well known for Afton Alps, the largest ski and snowboard area in the Twin Cities metropolitan area. It is home to Afton State Park on the St. Croix River. Due to these two destinations and its quaint small-town appearance in a major metropolitan area, Afton receives a fair amount of local tourism in the form of day trips. The 2018 US Winter Olympic Gold Medalist cross-country skier Jessie Diggins is from Afton.

History
The first settlers in the area arrived in 1837. The settlement of Afton was platted in 1855, with the name chosen from a poem (Sweet Afton) by Robert Burns. A post office has been in operation at Afton since 1857. The city contains three properties listed on the National Register of Historic Places: the 1856 Erastus Bolles House, the 1864 Newington Gilbert House, and the 1867 Cushing Hotel.

Geography
Main routes include Hudson Road, County Roads 18, 21, and 71; and Minnesota Highway 95. Afton borders Lake St. Croix Beach, Lakeland, and St. Mary's Point to the east. It also borders West Lakeland Township to the north, Denmark Township to the south, and Woodbury to the west.

Demographics

2010 census
As of the 2010 United States Census, there were 2,886 people, 1,081 households, and 863 families in the city. The population density was 115/sqmi (44.4/km). There were 1,143 housing units at an average density of 45.6/sqmi (17.6/km). The racial makeup of the city was 93.3% White, 0.7% African American, 0.4% Native American, 4.3% Asian, 0.1% Pacific Islander, 0.6% from other races, and 0.7% from two or more races. Hispanic or Latino of any race were 1.7% of the population.

There were 1,081 households, of which 29.1% had children under the age of 18 living with them, 72.5% were married couples living together, 4.5% had a female householder with no husband present, 2.8% had a male householder with no wife present, and 20.2% were non-families. 15.6% of all households were made up of individuals, and 5.4% had someone living alone who was 65 years of age or older. The average household size was 2.67 and the average family size was 2.98.

The median age in the city was 48.2 years. 21.4% of residents were under the age of 18; 6.6% were between the ages of 18 and 24; 16.1% were from 25 to 44; 42.1% were from 45 to 64; and 14% were 65 years of age or older. The gender makeup of the city was 50.0% male and 50.0% female.

2000 census
As of the 2000 United States Census, there were 2,839 people, 996 households, and 833 families residing in the city. The population density was 113/sqmi (43.7/km). There were 1,027 housing units at an average density of 40.9/sqmi (15.8/km). The racial makeup of the city was 96.65% White, 0.25% African American, 1.02% Asian, 0.39% from other races, and 1.69% from two or more races. Hispanic or Latino of any race were 0.95% of the population.

There were 996 households, out of which 37.3% had children under the age of 18 living with them, 75.5% were married couples living together, 5.1% had a female householder with no husband present, and 16.3% were non-families. 12.6% of all households were made up of individuals, and 3.6% had someone living alone who was 65 years of age or older.  The average household size was 2.85 and the average family size was 3.11.

The city population contained 26.8% under the age of 18, 5.6% from 18 to 24, 23.7% from 25 to 44, 35.5% from 45 to 64, and 8.3% who were 65 years of age or older. The median age was 42 years. For every 100 females, there were 98.3 males. For every 100 females age 18 and over, there were 97.6 males.

The median income for a household in the city was $89,095, and the median income for a family was $96,087. Males had a median income of $64,135 versus $37,300 for females. The per capita income for the city was $36,338.  None of the families and 0.6% of the population were living below the poverty line, including no under eighteens and none of those over 64.

References

External links

 City of Afton – Official Website

Cities in Minnesota
Cities in Washington County, Minnesota
Populated places established in 1855
1855 establishments in Minnesota Territory